Cool Water is a men's fragrance introduced in 1988 by Davidoff and produced under license by Coty Inc. as part of its Coty Prestige brand portfolio.

Advertising
Lost star Josh Holloway, Paul Walker and Scott Eastwood are notable actors who appeared in Cool Water promotional material, featuring in a number of television commercials and posters for Davidoff Cool Water in 2008.

Development
The perfumer is Pierre Bourdon. Cool Water contains mint, sea water and rosemary as top notes, lavender, jasmine, geranium and  neroli as ''heart notes, and  oakmoss, musk and sandalwood as base notes.

List of products
Davidoff has released numerous editions of the original Cool Water fragrance:

 1997: Cool Water Woman
 2002: Cool Water Energizing Cologne (limited edition)
 2004: Cool Water Frozen (limited edition)
 2004: Cool Water Deep
 2005: Cool Water Sea, Scents and Sun (limited edition)
 2005: Cool Water Deep: Sea, Scents and Sun (limited edition)
 2006: Cool Water Summer Fizz (limited edition)
 2006: Cool Water Deep Summer Fizz (limited edition)
 2006: Cool Water Game
 2007: Cool Water Wave (limited edition) only available for women
 2007: Cool Water Happy Summer (limited edition)
 2007: Cool Water Game: Happy Summer (limited edition)
 2008: Cool Water Freeze Me (limited edition)
 2009: Cool Water Cool Summer (limited edition)
 2010: Cool Water Ice Fresh (limited edition)
 2011: Cool Water Summer Dive (limited edition)
 2012: Cool Water Pure Pacific (limited edition)
 2013: Cool Water Into the Ocean (limited edition)
 2014: Cool Water Coral Reef (limited edition)
 2014: Cool Water Night Dive
 2015: Cool Water Summer Seas (limited edition)
 2016: Cool Water Exotic Summer (limited edition) 
 2016: Cool Water Ocean Extreme (limited edition)
 2017: Cool Water Pacific (limited edition)
 2017: Cool Water Wave
 2018: Cool Water Caribbean (summer edition)
 2018: Cool Water The Coolest Edition (30th anniversary limited edition)
 2019: Cool Water Summer Edition 2019 (limited edition)
 2019: Cool Water Intense
 2020: Cool Water Aquaman (collector edition)
 2021: Cool Water Street Fighter Champion Summer Edition
 2021: Cool Water Parfum
 2022: Cool Water Grapefruit & Sage (limited edition)
 2022: Cool Water Reborn
 2023: Cool Water Oceanic Edition (limited edition)

References

External links
 

Perfumes
Products introduced in 1988